Centenary Fields is a   Local Nature Reserve in Lingfield in Surrey. It is owned by Lingfield Parish Council and managed by  Lingfield Wildlife Area Committee.

This site, which is managed by local volunteers, has grassland, a wildflower meadow, allotments, a butterfly garden and a community orchard where a local variety of apple, the Lingfield Forge, is being grown.

There is access from Vicarage Road.

References

Local Nature Reserves in Surrey